Yes Yes may refer to:

 "Yes Yes", a song by Zion I from their 2006 album Break a Dawn
 "Yes Yes", a song by The Colourist from their 2014 album The Colourist
 "Yes Yes", a song by MoStack from his 2019 album Stacko

See also
 Yes (disambiguation)
 Yeah Yeah (disambiguation)